Eucereon aroa is a moth of the subfamily Arctiinae. It was described by Schaus in 1894. It is found in Mexico, Guatemala and Venezuela.

References

aroa
Moths described in 1894